Pseudorectes is a bird genus in the family Pachycephalidae endemic to New Guinea.

Pseudorectes

Extant species
It contains the following species:
 White-bellied pitohui (Pseudorectes incertus)
 Rusty pitohui (Pseudorectes ferrugineus)

Former species
Formerly, some authorities also considered the following species (or subspecies) as species within the genus Pseudorectes:
 Oriole whistler (as Pseudorectes cinnamomeum)

References 

 
Bird genera